In statistics, the matrix normal distribution or matrix Gaussian distribution is a probability distribution that is a generalization of the multivariate normal distribution to matrix-valued random variables.

Definition 
The probability density function for the random matrix X (n × p) that  follows the matrix normal distribution  has the form:

The matrix normal is related to the multivariate normal distribution in the following way:

if and only if

Proof
The equivalence between the above matrix normal and multivariate normal density functions can be shown using several properties of the trace and Kronecker product, as follows. We start with the argument of the exponent of the matrix normal PDF:  

The proof is completed by using the determinant property:

Properties
If , then we have the following properties:

Expected values
The mean, or expected value is:

and we have the following second-order expectations:

where  denotes trace.

More generally, for appropriately dimensioned matrices A,B,C:

Transformation
Transpose transform:

Linear transform: let D (r-by-n), be of full rank r ≤ n and C (p-by-s), be of full rank s ≤ p, then:

Example
Let's imagine a sample of n independent p-dimensional random variables identically distributed according to a multivariate normal distribution:
.

Maximum likelihood parameter estimation
Given k  matrices, each of size n × p, denoted , which we assume have been sampled i.i.d. from a matrix normal distribution, the maximum likelihood estimate of the parameters can be obtained by maximizing:

The solution for the mean has a closed form, namely

but the covariance parameters do not. However, these parameters can be iteratively maximized by zero-ing their gradients at: 

and

See for example  and references therein. The covariance parameters are non-identifiable in the sense that for any scale factor, s>0, we have:

Drawing values from the distribution
Sampling from the matrix normal distribution is a special case of the sampling procedure for the multivariate normal distribution. Let  be an n by p matrix of np independent samples from the standard normal distribution, so that
 
Then let 
 
so that
 
where A and B can be chosen by Cholesky decomposition or a similar matrix square root operation.

Relation to other distributions
Dawid (1981) provides a discussion of the relation of the matrix-valued normal distribution to other distributions, including the Wishart distribution, inverse-Wishart distribution and matrix t-distribution, but uses different notation from that employed here.

See also 
 Multivariate normal distribution

References

 
 
 

Random matrices
Continuous distributions
Multivariate continuous distributions